Les Chemins de l’amour (The pathways of love), FP 106-Ia, is a song (mélodie) for voice and piano composed in 1940 by Francis Poulenc on lyrics by Jean Anouilh, based on a waltz sung from the incidental music of the play Léocadia.

Genesis 
Composed in October 1940, the song is dedicated to the comedian and singer Yvonne Printemps, who sang it at the premiere of the play Léocadia on 1 December 1940. The song was somewhat successful, and Printemps recorded it.

Max Eschig published the score in 1945.

Discography 
 Yvonne Printemps and Marcel Cariven (conducting).
  and Georges Delerue (conducting). Grand Prix du disque.
 Felicity Lott (soprano) and Graham Johnson (piano) - Hyperion.
 Jessye Norman (soprano) and Dalton Baldwin (piano) - Philips.
 Véronique Gens (soprano) and Roger Vignoles (piano) - Erato.
 Patricia Petibon (soprano), Christian-Pierre La Marca (cello), Amandine Savary (piano) - Sony.
 Sophie Karthäuser (soprano), Eugène Asti (piano) - Harmonia Mundi
 Mischa Maisky (cello), Daria Havora (piano) - Deutsche Grammophon

References

External links 
 Yvonne Printemps - Les chemins de l'amour by Poulenc on YouTube
 Léocadia, FP 106 (Poulenc, Francis) on IMSLP
 French original lyrics and English translation 
 Two interprétations

Compositions by Francis Poulenc
1940 compositions
French songs
Mélodies
Works by Jean Anouilh